The Norfolk gerygone (Gerygone modesta) is a species of bird in the family Acanthizidae.
It is endemic to Norfolk Island.

Its natural habitats are subtropical or tropical moist lowland forests, subtropical or tropical moist shrubland, and pastureland.
It is threatened by habitat loss.

References

External links

BirdLife Species Factsheet.

Birds of Australia

Birds of Norfolk Island
Gerygone
Vulnerable fauna of Australia
Birds described in 1860
Taxonomy articles created by Polbot